Mangifera indica, commonly known as mango, is a species of flowering plant in the family Anacardiaceae. There are two distinct genetic populations in modern mangoesthe "Indian type" and the "Southeast Asian type".

Description
It is a large green tree, valued mainly for its fruits, both green and ripe. Approximately 500 varieties have been reported in India. The leaves are simple, shiny and dark green.

Red-yellow flowers appear at the end of winter, and also at the beginning of spring. Both male and female flowers are borne on same tree. Climatic conditions have a significant influence on the time of flowering. In South Asia, flowering starts in December in the south, in January in Bihar and Bengal, in February in eastern Uttar Pradesh, and in February–March in northern India. The duration of flowering is 20–25 days for the Dasheri variety, while panicle emergence occurs in early December and flower opening is completed by February. The Neelum variety produces two crops a year in Kanyakumari, Tamil Nadu, but it flowers only once in North Indian conditions.

The mango is an irregular, egg-shaped fruit which is a fleshy drupe. The fruits can be round, oval, heart, or kidney shaped. Mango fruits are green when they are unripe. The interior flesh is bright orange and soft with a large, flat pit in the middle. Mangos are mature in April and May. Raw mangos can be used in the making of pickles and chutneys. Ripe mangos are a popular fruit throughout the world. The skin and pulp account for 85% of the mango's weight, and the remaining 15% comes from the stone (seed).

Chemistry 
Mangiferin (a pharmacologically active hydroxylated xanthone C-glycoside) is extracted from mango at high concentrations from the young leaves (172 g/kg), bark (107 g/kg), and from old leaves (94 g/kg). Allergenic urushiols are present in the fruit peel.

Taxonomy 
Mangoes are believed to have originated from the region between northwestern Myanmar, Bangladesh, and northeastern India. M. indica were domesticated separately in South Asia and Southeast Asia over centuries, resulting in two distinct genetic populations in modern mangoesthe "Indian type" and the "Southeast Asian type".

The species was first described by Linnaeus in 1753.

Distribution and habitat 
Since their domestication in southeastern Asia, mangoes have been introduced to other warm regions of the world.

The tree grows best in well-drained sandy loam; it does not grow well in heavy wet soils. The optimal pH of the soil should be between 5.2 and 7.5.

Cultivation

Toxicity 
Urushiols in the fruit peel can trigger contact dermatitis in sensitised individuals. This reaction is more likely to occur in people who have been exposed to other plants from the family Anacardiaceae, such as poison oak and poison ivy, which are widespread in the United States.

The wood is known to produce phenolic substances that can cause contact dermatitis.

Uses 

The tree is more known for its fruit rather than for its timber. However, mango trees can be converted to lumber once their fruit-bearing lifespan has finished. The wood is susceptible to damage from fungi and insects. The wood is used for musical instruments such as ukuleles, plywood and low-cost furniture.

Culture
The mango is the national fruit of India, Pakistan, and the Philippines, and is the national tree of Bangladesh.

Gallery

References

Further reading
 Litz, Richard E. (ed. 2009). The Mango: Botany, Production and Uses (2nd edition). CABI. .

External links
 
 
 
 Crop of the Day: Mango, Mangifera indica has a list of helpful resources about this species.

indica
Plants described in 1753
Taxa named by Carl Linnaeus
Flora of Assam (region)
Flora of Myanmar
National symbols of India
National symbols of Pakistan
National symbols of Bangladesh
Flora of Maharashtra
Fruit trees
Trees in Buddhism
Symbols of Gujarat
Symbols of Maharashtra